Munchkin Country or Munchkinland, as it is referred to in the famous MGM musical film version, is the fictional eastern region of the Land of Oz in L. Frank Baum's Oz books, first described in The Wonderful Wizard of Oz (1900).  Munchkin Country is in the East, noted by later being ruled by the Wicked Witch of the East.

In The Wonderful Wizard of Oz, it was originally called "the land of Munchkins", but is referred to as "Munchkin Country" in all subsequent Oz books. Munchkin Country is linked to Oz's imperial capital the Emerald City by means of the yellow brick road. The native inhabitants of this quadrant are called Munchkins. In the story, the novel's protagonist Dorothy Gale, attends a celebration upon her arrival to Oz at the mansion of Boq, who is the friendliest and wealthiest Munchkin man. "Munchkin" does not necessarily mean someone of short stature. Many Munchkins portrayed in the books are of normal height, most notably Nick Chopper (also known as the Tin Woodman).

The Classic Oz Books
The publishing company Reilly & Britton (later Reilly & Lee) published, in the form of end-papers to the first edition of Tik-Tok of Oz (1914), one of the Oz books, the only authenticated map (reproduced here) that shows the Land of Oz in its entirety. For some undiscovered reason, this map flip-flops the directions of east and west. The West and East subsection of the Wikipedia article on the Land of Oz discusses this error and the resulting contradictions. The revised version of the map published by the International Wizard of Oz Club corrects the directions and reverses the map.

Munchkin Country is distinguished by the color blue, which is worn by most of the Munchkins, as well as the color of their surroundings. While the Eastern part of the Munchkin Country is described as rich, beautiful, fertile and pleasant, and inhabited by friendly people, the Western part of the province (i.e., the region bordered by a large forest and the area surrounding the Emerald City) is wild, rough and dangerous. Certain areas of this land are densely forested, and inhabited by ferocious beasts.

Munchkin Country is the site where Dorothy Gale's house lands after being carried to Oz by a cyclone. Munchkin Country's ruler was the Wicked Witch of the East but upon Dorothy's arrival in Oz, she is eliminated when the house lands on top of her, causing much celebration among the Munchkins.

Princess Ozma's party visited the King of the Munchkins on their return from the Dominions of the Nome King, and found Jinjur working in his employ. This king also appears briefly in The Road to Oz.

Subsequent Oz books
Ruth Plumly Thompson's books identify the king of the Munchkin Country as Cheeriobed. He rules from the Sapphire City in the Ozure Isles, with his wife, Queen Orin, and son, Prince Philador. He is introduced by name in The Giant Horse of Oz and makes a subsequent appearance in The Wishing Horse of Oz.  In some of Thompson's Oz books, the geography is inverted, with the Munchkin Country in the Western part of Oz and the Winkie Country in the East.

John R. Neill's Oz books name the Scarecrow as king of the Munchkins, although this contradicts the previous books. He is never shown in this capacity; he is simply stated to be so.

In The Patchwork Girl of Oz, it is revealed that parts of the Yellow Brick Road have Man-Eating Plants near them.

Modern works
In Gregory Maguire's novels, Wicked: The Life and Times of the Wicked Witch of the West and Son of a Witch (which use "Munchkinland"), the characters are not all Munchkins, and so they are actually called Munchkinlanders. In these books (unlike the more famous movie), Munchkins are generally shorter than average height, though the more powerful families, as Frexspar said, "married into some height along the way." Maguire portrays Munchkinland as the corn belt of Oz, geographically, Munchkinland is a vast province in eastern Oz, filled with huge farmlands, known as the "Corn Basket" and small towns and villages scattered all around, the famous Yellow Brick Road runs all over the region from the town of Center Munch to the southern gate of the Emerald City, known as Munchkin Mousehole, just outside a forested area known as the Pine Barrens; there are also some lakes, such as Mossmere, Illswater and Restwater, the biggest lake of the nation and the birthplace of the Munchkin River that runs along the road and between the corn fields, the Madeleines at the west make the natural border with Gillikin and the mountainous hills within the Quadling Kells are the borders of the southern Quadling Country, The mines of The Glikkus are located directly north. Munchkinland is also shown to be the native home of Elphaba, or the Wicked Witch of the West, and her younger sister Nessarose (although in the novel, they grew up in Quadling Country). In the Broadway musical Wicked, based on the novel, their father is the governor of Munchkinland. In both adaptations, Nessarose eventually comes to power but her corrupt rule earns her loathing by the Munchkinlanders and the name, "Wicked Witch of the East".

Locations and inhabitants
Like all the countries of Oz, the Munchkin Country contains various unusual sights, creatures, and places. Among them are:

 Munchkin Village - This is where Dorothy's house landed after it was picked up by a tornado.
 Deadly Poppy Field - The poppies in this field have a spicy scent and makes anything living faint. Scarecrow, Tin Man, and the Field Mice had to get Dorothy, Toto, and Cowardly Lion out of the poppy field. In the 1939 film, the Wicked Witch of the West had enchanted some poppies to put the group to sleep. Their effects were neutralized when Glinda used her magic to make it snow.
 Mount Munch - A "big tall hill" in the eastern extreme of Munchkin Country. The base of its peak touches the Deadly Desert. Mount Munch is home to the Hyups as seen in The Magic of Oz.
 College of Art and Athletic Perfection - A school that was founded by Professor Woggle-Bug in the southwestern part of Munchkin Country as seen in Ozma of Oz and The Emerald City of Oz. The students at the College take school pills that give a student knowledge without having to attend lessons so that the student's time can be applied to Athletic pursuits.
 Dicksy Land - Dicksy Land (a pun on "dixieland") is a "mixed and topsy-turvy" in Munchkin Country. Apples grow on raspberry bushes and raspberries on apple trees, roses are daisies and daisies are roses. The houses have windows where their doors should be, and vice versa. Their chimneys protrude from their sides instead of their tops. Though Dicksy Land is an urban environment, it does support a population of Dicky Birds. The inhabitants of Dicksy Land are called Dicks.
 Fiddlestick Forest - A forest that plays a soothing music at night. There is a river where a magic boat rides on.
 Lake Orizon - A lake that is high in the mountains of Munchkin Country as seen in The Giant Horse of Oz. Unusually for a mountain lake in an inland location, Lake Orizon is a saltwater body rather than a freshwater body. It has been compared to an inland sea. It bears five islands that make up the Ozure Isles, an independent polity with the Sapphire City as its capital. Lake Orizon also contains Hippocampus which can be used as a mode of transportation. Mombi placed the lake monster Quiberon (a dragon-headed "fearfish") in Lake Orizon to terrorize its inhabitants where Quiberon also ate the Hippocampus into extinction. The Wizard of Oz turned Quiberon into a statue and used his magic to reconstitute the Hippocampus from their bones causing their species to live once more.
 Cave City - A series of caves that are underneath Lake Orizon. They are home to the Cave Men, a race of living hieroglyphics or shades that are two dimensional.
 Ozure Isles - The Ozure Isles are five islands that are located in Lake Orizon. The islands are small, and built up of sparkling cliffs, rich with iridescent gems and honeycombed with caves and grottoes. The pebbles of the beaches are actually amethysts, opals, pearls, rubies, turquoises, and especially sapphires, which are so common that they endow the Isles with a dazzling blue light.
 Sapphire City - The capital of the Ozure Isles. It is the second fairest city only to the Emerald City in the Land of Oz. Sapphire City is characterized by sapphires. The garden of the king's castle includes an enchanted tree that bears a single golden pear at a time. Eating the pear generates a powerful pair of magic gold wings on the eater's back.
 Moojer Mountain - Moojer Mountain is a peak in Munchkin Country that is not far from the Emerald City. A cabin on the barren top of the mountain was once the lair of Mooj the Magician. The curious figure of X. Pando the elevator man provides lifts to the top of the mountain, though it is uncertain how much traffic he bears.
 Mudge - A dry desert-like country in the southern part of Munchkin Country. According to Glinda, the Mudgers are barbaric and war-like in nature and any Mudger who sets foot outside of Mudge will be beheaded.
 Munchkin River - A river that flows through Munchkin Country. It interrupts the path of the Yellow Brick Road to the Poppy Field.
 Seebania - A small kingdom in the southern part of Munchkin Country. Its rulers once controlled much of that land. When Princess Ozma came to rule Oz, the Seebanian kings voluntarily withdrew to their own little land, dwelling in their capital Shamsbad.
 Shutter Town - A town where its inhabitants are the Shutterfaces, a race of people who have shutters attached to their faces to keep anyone from seeing them. The Shutterfaces prefer to be left alone.
 Unicorners - A location that contains a community of unicorns. The unicorns are served by blue dwarves and live in hollowed out trees. There are also silver apples there that can prevent hunger for seven days.
 Jose Altuve - Houston Astros player and ambassador to Munchkin Country.

References

Fictional elements introduced in 1900
Oz countries
Fictional kingdoms